The Flora and Fauna Series was a series of Philippine peso coins minted from 1983 to 1994, in denominations from 1 sentimo to ₱2. The series used the Optima typeface. The sizes of the coins were reduced, and ₱5 coins were reintroduced, in 1991. Production of 50-sentimo and ₱2 coins ceased in 1995.

History

In 1983, eight years after the introduction of the Ang Bagong Lipunan Series, a new series called the Flora and Fauna Series was introduced, in which the coins, in addition to featuring various Philippine national heroes as before, also began featuring plant and animal life forms native to the Philippines. The 50-sentimo and 2-piso denominations were reintroduced, the latter of which had not been struck as a coin since the Spanish had struck it in gold. The 5-piso denomination was stopped, but production resumed (in a new, smaller size) in the final four years of the Flora and Fauna Series, which featured reduced sizes for all denominations.

The Flora and Fauna series contained errors on two coins, in 1983. The text on the 10-sentimo coin for the scientific name of the Philippine goby was minted as "Pandaka pygmea" instead of "Pandaka pygmaea", and the 50-sentimo coin showing the Philippine eagle misspelled the scientific name as "Pithecobhaga jefferyi" instead of "Pithecophaga jefferyi".

In 1985, some of the 1-peso and 25-sentimo coins had a double strike error.

In 1991, the Improved Flora and Fauna Series was introduced. The denominations from 25 sentimo up to 2 peso were smaller, and the 5-peso coin was reintroduced. Some commemorative coins in 1991 were minted in the larger size. The size of the 25- and 50-sentimo coins of the Improved Flora and Fauna Series are same as the size of the twenty-five-satang and fifty-satang coins of Thailand, and the 50-sentimo (IFF series) and 50-satang coins (Thailand) both have reeded edges.

See also
 Coins of the Philippine peso
 Philippine two peso coin
 Philippine peso
 Coins of the Philippine peso

References

External links
 Philippine Banknotes and Coins
 Philippine Coins News & Updates

Philippines currency history